Cheryl is a female given name.

Cheryl may also refer to:

 Cheryl (singer), English singer formerly known as Cheryl Cole
 Cheryl (artist collective), a group of artists in New York
 "Cheryl" (composition), a 1947 jazz standard by Charlie Parker

See also
 
Charyl
 Sheryl